The 1974 Nevada gubernatorial election occurred on November 5, 1974. Incumbent Democrat Mike O'Callaghan successfully ran for re-election to a second term as Governor of Nevada, defeating Republican nominee Shirley Crumpler and Independent American nominee James Hay Houston.

Results

References

1974
Nevada
Gubernatorial
November 1974 events in the United States